Mineral County is the name of four counties in the United States:

 Mineral County, Colorado 
 Mineral County, Montana 
 Mineral County, Nevada 
 Mineral County, West Virginia